Events in the year 1941 in Japan. It corresponds to Shōwa 16 (昭和16年) in the Japanese calendar.

Incumbents
Emperor: Hirohito
Prime Minister:
Fumimaro Konoe: until October 18
Hideki Tōjō: from October 18

Governors
Aichi Prefecture: Kodama Kyuichi (until 26 March); Yukisawa Chiyoji (starting 26 March)
Akita Prefecture: Fumi 
Aomori Prefecture: Seiichi Ueda 
Ehime Prefecture: Shizuo Furukawa (until 4 November); Susumu Nakamura Noriyuki (starting 4 November)
Fukui Prefecture: Kubota 
Fukushima Prefecture: Sumio Hisakawa 
Gifu Prefecture: Miyano Shozo (until 7 January); Tetsushin Sudo (starting 7 January)
Gunma Prefecture: Susukida Yoshitomo (until 20 October); Goro Murata (starting 20 October)
Hiroshima Prefecture: Katsuroku Aikawa (until 26 March); Tokiji Yoshinaga (starting 26 March)
Ibaraki Prefecture: Tokitsugi Yoshinaga (until 26 March); Kanichi Naito (starting 26 March)
Iwate Prefecture: Yoshifumi Yamauchi 
Kagawa Prefecture: Osamu Eianhyaku 
Kanagawa Prefecture: Mitsuma Matsumura 
Kochi Prefecture: Tomoichi Koyama (until 7 January); Naoaki Hattori (starting 7 January)
Kumamoto Prefecture: Chioji Yukisawa 
Kyoto Prefecture: Ando Kyoushirou 
Mie Prefecture: Yoshiro Nakano 
Miyagi Prefecture: Nobuo Hayashin (starting 7 January)
Miyazaki Prefecture: Toru Hasegawa (until 7 January); Osafume Katsumi (starting 7 January)
Nagano Prefecture: Noburo Suzuki 
Niigata Prefecture: Yasui Seiichiro (until 7 January); Doi Shohei (starting 7 January)
Okinawa Prefecture: Fusataro Fuchigami (until 7 January); Hajime Hayakawa (starting 7 January)
Saga Prefecture: Masaki (until 26 March);  (starting 26 March)
Saitama Prefecture: Toki Ginjiro (until 7 April); Miyano Shozo (starting 7 April)
Shiname Prefecture: Yasuo Otsubo 
Tochigi Prefecture: Saburo Yamagata 
Tokyo: Okada Shuzo (until 7 January); Jitsuzo Kawanishi (starting 7 January)
Toyama Prefecture: Kenzo Yano (until 7 January); Kingo Machimura (starting 7 January)
Yamagata Prefecture: Hee Yamauchi

Events
January 25 – Panjiayu tragedy
January 30-March 1 – Battle of South Henan
March – Western Hubei Operation
March 14-April 9 – Battle of Shanggao
May 7–27 – Battle of South Shanxi
July 29 – Organo is founded, as predecessor name was Yamanashi Chemical Industry.
September 6-October 8 – Battle of Changsha (1941)
September 16 – An express train collision with standing local passenger train in Aboshi Station, Himeji, Hyogo Prefecture. Total 85 persons were fatalities, 71 persons were wounded, according to Railway Ministry of Japan official confirmed report. 
October 22 – Takahito, Prince Mikasa marries Yuriko Takagi henceforth Yuriko, Princess Mikasa
November Unknown – Toyō Optical and glass Manufacturing, as predecessor of optical instrument brand, Hoya was founded.
December 7 – Attack on Pearl Harbor
December 7–13 – Niihau Incident
December 8–10 – Battle of Guam (1941)
December 8–23 – Battle of Wake Island
December 8–25 – Battle of Hong Kong

Births
January 3 – Judi Yassin, actress
January 5 – Hayao Miyazaki, film director, producer, screenwriter, animator, author, and manga artist
January 22 – Rintaro, anime director
May 7 – Kinichi Hagimoto, comedian 
June 29 – Chieko Baisho, actress and singer
July 8 – Masayuki Minami , volleyball player(d. 2000)
August 26 – Akiko Wakabayashi, actress
September 10 – Gunpei Yokoi, creator of Game Boy and Game & Watch handheld systems (b. 1997)
November 21 – Eiji Kanie, voice actor (d. 1985)
December 10 – Kyu Sakamoto, singer and actor (d. 1985)

Deaths
January 22 – Hayashi Tadataka, former daimyō (b. 1848)
August 22 – Hasegawa Shigure, playwright (b. 1879)
August 27 – Mitsuko Aoyama, emigrate, wife of Heinrich von Coudenhove-Kalergi (b. 1874)
September 2 – Kei Okami, physician, first Japanese woman to obtain a degree in Western medicine from a Western university (b. 1859)
December 11 – Masaaki Iinuma, aviator, flew the first Japanese-built aircraft from Japan to Western Europe (b. 1912)
December 13 – Shigenori Nishikaichi, military pilot (b. ca.1919)
December 24 – Sueo Ōe, athlete (killed in action) (b. 1914)

See also
 List of Japanese films of the 1940s

References

 
1940s in Japan
Years of the 20th century in Japan